Hitchwiki is "a collaborative project to build a free guide for hitchhikers". It is an international exchange for information about hitchhiking in many countries, and contains specific tips, for example, for hitchhiking out of the large cities, general information about equipment, safety and strategies to quickly and efficiently hitchhike. There are also personal profiles of the hitchhikers, travel stories, photos, blogs and discussion forums. According to the Guardian, it is part of an "internet-fueled revival" of hitchhiking.

The project was started on April 14, 2005, abandoned for a while and then moved to Wikia. In November 2006, it was moved to hitchwiki.org and relaunched as Hitchwiki; at the same time versions of it in other languages were started. As of January 2015 there are 3,129 articles on the English language Hitchwiki, while the site is already available in other languages, notably German, which had 1205 articles in Jan 2015, but also smaller wikis in Spanish, French, Finnish, Portuguese, Bulgarian and Russian. The website makes use of MediaWiki, WordPress and BuddyPress and allows anonymous edits. Database dumps of the articles are available for download.

References

External links 
 Hitchwiki.org (multilingual portal)
 English Hitchwiki

Travel websites
Hitchhiking
Wiki communities
Internet services supporting OpenID
MediaWiki websites
Creative Commons-licensed websites